Duna Records is a record label founded by desert rocker Brant Bjork.

As of mid-September 2007 the dunarecords.com website no longer hosted tour dates or album information, being replaced with a simple text message "Brant Bjork is a modern guitar hero and rock legend, hailing from infamous stoner rock bands such as Kyuss, Fu Manchu, and Ché. He currently tours with his own band Brant Bjork & the Bros." 
Since July 2009, dunarecords.com has morphed into a Brant Bjork fansite hosting reviews and interviews, album information, videos, discographies, links, tour dates, and a community forum.

Duna has since been revived under the new name "Low Desert Punk Recordings". First release is Brant Bjork's Punk Rock Guilt.

Discography

See also
 List of record labels

References

External links
 Official site

American record labels
Alternative rock record labels